John Wurts (August 13, 1792April 23, 1861) was a member of the U.S. House of Representatives from Pennsylvania and a president of the Delaware and Hudson Canal Company.

John Wurts was born in Flanders, New Jersey.  After his father's death in 1793 the family resided in Montville, New Jersey, and subsequently moved to Philadelphia, Pennsylvania.  He graduated from Princeton College in 1813, studied law, was admitted to the bar in 1816 and commenced practice in Philadelphia.  He was a member of the Pennsylvania House of Representatives in 1817 and served in the Pennsylvania State Senate in 1820.

Wurts was elected to the Nineteenth Congress.  He was not a candidate for renomination.  He was United States district attorney from 1827 to 1831 and a member of the city council of Philadelphia.

Along with his brothers William, Maurice, and Charles, he helped found the Delaware and Hudson Canal Company and served as president from 1831 to 1858.

He went abroad for his health in 1859 and died in Rome in 1861 (at the time of his death, Rome was under the direct rule of the Pope, with Italian unification not reaching completion until 1871).  Interment in the family cemetery at Pleasant Mills, New Jersey, near Batsto, New Jersey.

Sources

The Political Graveyard

External links
Wurts family papers at Hagley Museum and Library

Philadelphia City Council members
Princeton University alumni
Pennsylvania state senators
Members of the Pennsylvania House of Representatives
People from Montville, New Jersey
Politicians from Morris County, New Jersey
1792 births
1861 deaths
Jacksonian members of the United States House of Representatives from Pennsylvania
19th-century American politicians